Ormosia jamaicensis is a species of flowering plant in the family Fabaceae. It is found only in Jamaica.

References

jamaicensis
Flora of Jamaica
Endangered plants
Endemic flora of Jamaica
Taxonomy articles created by Polbot
Plants described in 1908